The 2011 World Touring Car Championship season was the eighth season of the FIA World Touring Car Championship, and the seventh since its 2005 return. The championship, which was open to Super 2000 cars and Diesel 2000 cars, began with the Race of Brazil at Curitiba on 20 March and ended with the Guia Race of Macau at the Guia Circuit on 20 November, after twelve events and twenty-four races.

The series underwent major changes with new circuits Suzuka and Tianma coming into the championship, new drivers such as Pepe Oriola to SUNRED Engineering and Robert Dahlgren with Polestar Racing for the whole season. The series lost the FIA Formula Two Championship as a support championship, but it was replaced by Auto GP. It was also supported by a brand new series, European Production Series which supported the six rounds at Zolder, Monza, Brno, Donington, Oschersleben and Valencia.

Teams and drivers
A provisional list of teams and drivers was revealed on 23 February, and the official entry list was published on 4 March.

Team and driver changes
Chevrolet retained their three full-time drivers from 2010, Yvan Muller, Robert Huff and Alain Menu. Cacá Bueno also joined the team in a fourth car at his home meeting in Curitiba. The team utilized the newly introduced  engine. Again, two further Chevrolets were entered by bamboo-engineering, who retained their 2010 drivers, Darryl O'Young and Yukinori Taniguchi. Bamboo campaigned Lacettis at the first round in Curitiba, but contested the rest of the season with Cruzes.

SUNRED Engineering again ran six cars through three different team guises. Gabriele Tarquini remained with the team and was joined by former SEAT León Eurocup racer Aleksei Dudukalo, who brought Lukoil sponsorship into the team. Another three-car outfit was headed by Tiago Monteiro, who was joined by Michel Nykjær, and another graduate from the SEAT León Eurocup, Pepe Oriola. Fredy Barth completed the SEAT sextet, with his SEAT Swiss Racing by SUNRED team. The SEATs began the season using a two-litre turbo diesel engine and from Hungary introduced a similar engine to that used in the Chevrolets. However, the cars were branded as SR Leon with no SEAT support at all. Leaving the team is Jordi Gené, who parted with the team before the end of the 2010 season.

Norbert Michelisz remained in the championship with the Zengő Dension Team, but switched to a BMW 320 TC, having campaigned a SEAT in 2010, winning a race at Macau. He began his campaign at the second round of the season at Zolder. Three other teams campaigned a single 320 TC during the season; ROAL Motorsport returned to the series, with Tom Coronel switching from a SUNRED SEAT, Wiechers-Sport ran Urs Sonderegger – another driver from the SEAT León Eurocup – at the European races held during the season, and DeTeam KK Motorsport ran Marchy Lee, who steps up from the Asian Porsche Carrera Cup.

The factory BMW Team RBM did not return in 2011, and drivers Augusto Farfus and Andy Priaulx moved into sportscar racing, entering the Intercontinental Le Mans Cup. Independent BMWs were however campaigned by the Proteam Racing and Liqui Moly Team Engstler outfits. Proteam ran three BMWs; two 320 TCs for Mehdi Bennani, who moves from Wiechers-Sport and former single-seater racer Javier Villa, as well as a naturally aspirated 320si for Fabio Fabiani. Bennani and Villa replaced Independents' champion Sergio Hernández and Stefano D'Aste. Team Engstler ran two cars once again, with Franz Engstler being joined by Kristian Poulsen, who drove for his own team in 2010 after driving for Engstler in 2009. Poulsen replaced Andrei Romanov.

Polestar Racing campaigned a Volvo full-time in 2011, having contested five meetings over the past four seasons. Swedish Touring Car Championship runner-up Robert Dahlgren again campaigned the car as he had done in each of Polestar's events to date. The team also introduced a similar engine in the mid-season.

Calendar
The provisional calendar for the 2011 season was approved by the FIA World Motor Sport Council on 8 September 2010 with further amendments on 3 November 2010, 7 December 2010 and 8 March 2011.

Calendar changes
 The Race of Brazil was going to move from Curitiba to Interlagos. The move was reverted due to logistical issues connected to renovation at Interlagos in regards to safety in the Subida dos Boxes area, which has been the site of touring car fatalities.
 The Race of China will be held for the first time. It was originally scheduled to be held at the Guangdong International Circuit, but was later relocated to the Tianma Circuit.
 The Race of Portugal returned to Porto as in recent odd years.
 The Race of Japan moved from Okayama to Suzuka.
 The Race of UK moved from Brands Hatch to Donington Park.
 The Race of Argentina was originally scheduled to be held in Buenos Aires, but was dropped from the calendar and replaced with the Race of Belgium when the circuit failed its homologation and it was found that there would not be enough time to complete the work necessary to upgrade the circuit to the required standard.
 The Race of Morocco was dropped from the calendar, and replaced by the new Race of Hungary.

Results and standings

Races

Standings

Drivers' Championship

† — Drivers did not finish the race, but were classified as they completed over 90% of the race distance.

Drivers Championship points were awarded on a 25–18–15–12–10–8–6–4–2–1 basis for the first ten places in each race.

Manufacturers' Championship

Manufacturers Championship points were awarded on a 25–18–15–12–10–8–6–4–2–1 basis for the first ten places in each race. However, only the results obtained by the best two cars classified per manufacturer in each race were counted. All the other cars of that same manufacturer were invisible as far as scoring points is concerned.

Yokohama Drivers' Trophy

Yokohama Teams' Trophy

Jay-Ten Trophy

Notes

References

External links
 Official website of the World Touring Car Championship